There are a number of different criteria which can be used for voting systems in an election:

Condorcet criterion
Condorcet loser criterion
Consistency criterion
Homogeneity criterion
Independence of clones criterion
Independence of irrelevant alternatives
Independence of Smith-dominated alternatives
Later-no-harm criterion
Later-no-help criterion
Majority criterion
Majority loser criterion
Monotonicity criterion
Mutual majority criterion
Participation criterion
Plurality criterion
Resolvability criterion
Reversal symmetry
Schwartz Criterion, requiring that the winner is chosen from the Schwartz set
Smith criterion

See also
Voting system
Experimental metrics